Tom Davies (born 11 January 1997) is an English rugby league footballer who plays as a er for the Catalans Dragons in the Betfred Super League and England at international level.

He previously played for the Wigan Warriors in the Super League, and spent time on loan from Wigan at the Swinton Lions in the Championship.

Background
Davies was born in Wigan, Greater Manchester, England.

He signed for Wigan after an initial trial having played amateur rugby league for Shevington Sharks, Orrell St. James and Wigan St. Patrick’s. At the time of the trial he was playing semi-professional rugby union with Flyde after being released from a scholarship with Leigh Centurions. He made his professional début on 19 March 2017, scoring a try against Huddersfield Giants in a 16–16 draw.

Club career

2017 
Following the departure of Josh Charnley to the Sale Sharks, and injuries to first team wingers Joe Burgess, Lewis Tierney and Dom Manfredi, Davies got his début against Huddersfield. After scoring on début he kept his place despite the return of Burgess and Tierney. He then scored a brace of long range tries against the Catalans Dragons. Further tries against Swinton, St. Helens and Hull FC helped him to a total of 14 tries in his rookie season.

2018 
After an impressive rookie season, Davies was handed the number 2 shirt at the Wigan club replacing the injured Dominic Manfredi. Davies scored Wigan's first try of the year with a diving effort against the Salford Red Devils followed by further tries against Widnes and Wakefield followed by a brace against Huddersfield to give him five tries in six appearances. His next try came four games later against Warrington at the Magic Weekend after Morgan Escare scooped up a loose pass and selflessly passed the ball to Davies rather than running to the line himself. Further tries came against Leeds, Warrington, Huddersfield, Wakefield and a 50m solo run against Castleford. After four games without scoring he scored a try in the derby against St Helens from a seemingly impossible position with two tacklers holding him up 2m from the line, but drove forward and reached out to plant the ball on the white line just after halftime to halt a potential Saints fightback. Known for his aggressive ball carrying he averaged 148m per game as well as averaging 3 tackle breaks and a clean break per match. Following his early season form he was called up to the England Knights Performance Squad before signing a new five year deal with the Wigan Warriors just a year after making his debut despite only recently signing a new improved deal.

He played in the 2018 Super League Grand Final victory over the Warrington Wolves at Old Trafford.

2021
In round 5 of the 2021 Super League season, he scored a hat-trick for Catalans in their victory over Wakefield Trinity.
On 9 October, Davies played for Catalans in their 2021 Super League Grand Final defeat against St. Helens.

International career
In July 2018 he was selected in the England Knights Performance squad. Later that year he was selected for the England Knights on their tour of Papua New Guinea. He played against Papua New Guinea at the Lae Football Stadium. Davies also played against PNG at the Oil Search National Football Stadium.

On 25 June 2021 he made a try-scoring début for England in their 24-26 defeat to the Combined Nations All Stars, staged at the Halliwell Jones Stadium, Warrington, as part of England’s 2021 Rugby League World Cup preparation.

He scored his second try for England in the 10-30 win over France on 23 Oct 2021, staged in Perpignan.

Career Stats

References

External links
Wigan Warriors profile
SL profile

1997 births
Living people
Catalans Dragons players
English expatriate rugby league players
England Knights national rugby league team players
England national rugby league team players
English rugby league players
Rugby league players from Wigan
Rugby league wingers
Swinton Lions players
Wigan St Patricks players
Wigan Warriors players